Paulo Roberto Teles Goes Sobrinho (born 24 August 1983 in Bahia), known as Paulinho, is a Brazilian professional footballer who played for Cypriot club Doxa Katokopias F.C. mainly as a right back.

Honours
Vitória Setúbal
Taça da Liga: 2007–08

Ermis Aradippou
Cypriot Super Cup: 2014

External links

1983 births
Living people
Brazilian footballers
Association football defenders
Campeonato Brasileiro Série A players
Campeonato Brasileiro Série C players
Esporte Clube Vitória players
Clube Atlético Juventus players
Primeira Liga players
Liga Portugal 2 players
Vitória F.C. players
C.D. Trofense players
Cypriot First Division players
Olympiakos Nicosia players
Apollon Limassol FC players
Ermis Aradippou FC players
Doxa Katokopias FC players
Brazilian expatriate footballers
Expatriate footballers in Portugal
Expatriate footballers in Cyprus
Brazilian expatriate sportspeople in Portugal
Brazilian expatriate sportspeople in Cyprus